The Federal Board of Intermediate and Secondary Education commonly known as FBISE) is a Government of Pakistan board for examining the intermediate and secondary education in Pakistan and abroad for Pakistan International School. It is authorized with financial and administrative authority to organize, manage, regulate, develop and control intermediate and secondary education in general and accomplish examinations in the institutions affiliated with it.

Examinations conducted by the Federal Board of Intermediate and Secondary Education (FBISE) are known to be fair and transparent. The education ministry is taking steps in order to improve the quality of other educational boards in Pakistan at par with FBISE

History
The federal board of intermediate and secondary education was established under the FBISE Act 1975. It is an autonomous body of working under the Ministry of Federal Education and Professional Training.

The result of SSC Annual Examination 2021 was announced on 04 Oct 2021. Top three position holders scored 1098, 1096 and 1095 marks respectively out of a total of 1100. These are the record-highest marks since the foundation of FBISE in 1975.

Jurisdiction
The Jurisdiction of the Federal Board of Intermediate and Secondary Education, Islamabad consists of the following:

Islamabad
Cantonments and Garrisons across Pakistan
Gilgit Baltistan
Federally Administered Tribal Areas
Pakistan International Schools outside Pakistan

Activities
Affiliate institutions imparting SSC and HSSC education within Pakistan and abroad
Prescribe courses of instructions for SSC and HSSC
Ensure provision of requisite facilities in the affiliated institutions
Hold exams, appoint examiners and supervisory staff
Institute measures to promote physical well-being of students

Examination
The FBISE board held the following exams both across Pakistan and also abroad for overseas Pakistanis:
Secondary School Certificate (SSC)
Secondary School Certificate is further divided into Secondary School Certificate Part-I (SSC-I) and Secondary School Certificate Part-II (SSC-II). SSC-I and SSC-II are often associated with Grade 9 and Grade 10th students.

Higher Secondary School Certificate (HSSC)
Higher Secondary School Certificate is further divided into Higher Secondary School Certificate Part-I (HSSC-I) and Higher Secondary School Certificate Part-II (HSSC-II). HSSC-I and HSSC-II are typically associated with Grade 11 and Grade 12th students.
Student Learning Outcomes (SLOs) Based Examination
In 2022, FBISE Changed its examination system from textbook based to conceptual learning or SLOs based. The student can learn the specified topic from anywhere (including internet). The student is not restricted to a particular/specified book or source. He or she can learn the topic from anywhere. Memorizing system was discontinued and From 2022 and onwards examination system was based on SLO. FBISE Conduct First SLOs based examination in 2022. SLOs based modal question papers along with their solutions were also uploaded on FBISE official website before examination.  As FBISE Changed the examination system between the academic year, students also protested against this. However, SLO based examination system decision  was not reversed back by FBISE. Chairman FBISE instructed the students regarding SLO based exams and other FBISE Staff also facilitate the students in this regard.

All Rights Are Reserved Of SLOs Based Examination Section Only By Syed Saad Bin Tahir.

See also
 List of educational boards in Pakistan

References

External links
 FBISE official website
 Federal Board 9th Class Result
   Federal Board 9th Class Date Sheet(unofficial)
 FBISE Federal Board 10th Class Date Sheet(unofficial)

Pakistan federal departments and agencies
Education in Islamabad
1975 establishments in Pakistan
Government agencies established in 1975
Education boards in Pakistan